The 61 cm Type 90 torpedo was a surface-fired torpedo used by the Imperial Japanese Navy during World War II. It was superseded by the Type 93 oxygen-powered torpedo, commonly called the Long Lance, as oxygen generating equipment was installed aboard the cruisers.

Development
The torpedo was based on a newly developed British   Whitehead torpedo. This weapon used a new double-action two-cylinder engine rather than the four-cylinder radial engine used by World War I-era British torpedoes. It was significantly faster, although it had a much shorter range (only ) than the Japanese 6th and 8th Year torpedoes. Twenty of these were bought with training warheads in 1926 for ¥30,000 each; the British allowed Japanese technicians to observe the manufacturing process and launch trials. Japan bought a manufacturing license in 1928 for ¥150,000.

The Japanese did not actually manufacture any of these torpedoes, but combined their technology with the results of independent Japanese research to produce the 61 cm Type 90. Testing of the prototypes was prolonged by the need to correct a number of design errors and manufacturing defects, but two prototypes were turned over to the Underwater School in 1931 for practical use. It was informally adopted for use in 1932, but not officially accepted until 15 November 1933. Production initially began at the Kure Naval Arsenal, but the Yokosuka and Sasebo Naval Arsenals began production later.

Description
It was a wet-heater design and mixed kerosene with compressed air to further expand the air used to power the two-cylinder engine. The engine was cooled by saltwater and the resulting steam was recycled for use by the engine.

Notes

References
 
  OCLC 77257764

External links
 

World War II naval weapons
Torpedoes of Japan